Clinton is a city in Clinton Township, Vermillion County, in the U.S. state of Indiana. The population was 4,893 at the 2010 census.

History
The city was established in 1829 and is named for DeWitt Clinton, governor of New York from 1817 to 1823. Many of Clinton's original settlers were immigrants working in coal mines, many from Italy. According to Vermillion County naturalization records, "...from 1856 to 1952... Vermillion County received almost 3,550 new citizens of foreign birth, the largest number coming during the first twelve years of [the 20th] century.  Italians accounted for one-third, or 1,178, of the total number who filed Declarations, with Austrians the next largest group (675) and then Scots. At least 77 percent of the Italians were from the northern regions of Italy." This was in contrast to the majority of Italian immigrants to America during this same time period that hailed from southern Italy. Over time, the coal mining industry in Clinton ended but many of the Italian settlers stayed at Clinton.

The Clinton post office has been in operation since 1823.

The Clinton Paving and Building Brick Company was established in 1893, at which time it was producing 40,000 bricks per day.

The Clinton Downtown Historic District and Hill Crest Community Center are listed on the National Register of Historic Places.

In 2016, a satirical news website posted a fake news story about the town, claiming that the mayor was changing the town's name to avoid referencing Bill and Hillary Clinton.

Geography

Clinton is located in the southern part of the county along the Wabash River, near the intersection of State Road 63 (which passes just west of the city) and State Road 163 (which passes through the city). U.S. Route 41 lies just to the east of the city, across the river in neighboring Parke County. The smaller town of Fairview Park is adjacent to Clinton on the north side of the city.

Highways

Indiana State Road 163
The Highway runs through Clinton, and takes streets Walnut, Main, Elm, 9th, Western and Hazel Bluff Rd.

Demographics

2010 census
As of the 2010 United States Census, there were 4,893 people, 1,988 households, and 1,232 families in the city. The racial makeup of the city was 97.5% White, 0.2% African American, 0.3% Native American, 0.2% Asian, 0.2% from other races, and 1.5% from two or more races. Hispanic or Latino of any race were 1.0% of the population.

There were 1,988 households, of which 32.8% had children under the age of 18 living with them, 40.8% were married couples living together, 15.6% had a female householder with no husband present, 5.5% had a male householder with no wife present, and 38.0% were non-families. 33.2% of all households were made up of individuals, and 13.9% had someone living alone who was 65 years of age or older. The average household size was 2.36 and the average family size was 2.96.

The median age in the city was 38.8 years. 24.7% of residents were under the age of 18; 8% were between the ages of 18 and 24; 25.4% were from 25 to 44; 24.2% were from 45 to 64; and 17.7% were 65 years of age or older. The gender makeup of the city was 47.5% male and 52.5% female.

2000 census
As of the 2000 United States Census, there were 5,126 people, 2,124 households, and 1,319 families in the city. The population density was 2,284.5/sqmi (883.6/km). There were 2,379 housing units at an average density of 1,060.3/sqmi (410.1/km). The racial makeup of the city was 98.15% White, 0.35% African American, 0.37% Native American, 0.08% Asian, 0.16% from other races, and 0.90% from two or more races. Hispanic or Latino of any race were 0.68% of the population.

There were 2,124 households, out of which 28.9% had children under the age of 18 living with them, 46.0% were married couples living together, 12.7% had a female householder with no husband present, and 37.9% were non-families. 33.9% of all households were made up of individuals, and 17.4% had someone living alone who was 65 years of age or older. The average household size was 2.29 and the average family size was 2.93.

The city population contained 22.9% under the age of 18, 8.6% from 18 to 24, 26.3% from 25 to 44, 21.0% from 45 to 64, and 21.2% who were 65 years of age or older. The median age was 38 years. For every 100 females, there were 83.8 males. For every 100 females age 18 and over, there were 77.1 males.

The median income for a household in the city was $29,330, and the median income for a family was $36,692. Males had a median income of $28,294 versus $22,927 for females. The per capita income for the city was $14,601. About 7.4% of families and 12.5% of the population were below the poverty line, including 11.3% of those under age 18 and 20.0% of those age 65 or over.

Economy
Situated along the Wabash River and between Interstate 70 and Interstate 74, Clinton offers a wide variety of resources and transportation options for companies looking for new locations. Two-thirds of the U.S. population can be reached within a one-day drive from Clinton.

Companies
The two largest and most visible companies in Clinton are Elanco, which produces animal health and food safety drugs, and White Construction Inc., a subsidiary of Infrastructure & Energy Alternatives (IEA) specializing in building energy infrastructure throughout North America. Both parent companies are headquartered in Indianapolis. Other local employers include Duke Energy, MSI Construction Inc, International Paper and National Gypsum Company which are located to the north of the city. The launch of the Vermillion Rise Mega Park is creating new opportunities for business expansion at the site of the former Newport Chemical Depot.

The city is served by Union Hospital – Clinton.

Law and government
Clinton city government consists of a mayor and a city council.

The current mayor is Jack Gilfoy Jr.

City Council Members
 Bart Mooney -R- Ward 4
 H. Dean Strohm -D- Ward 3
 John D. Moore -D- Ward 2
 Stephen L. Hose -D- Ward 1
 Marty Shortridge -R- At Large

Police
Billy J. MacLaren is the current Chief of Police.

Fire protection
The fire department is a combination career/volunteer organization.  Its current chief is Chris Strohm.

Education
Clinton, Indiana and the southern half of Vermillion County are served by the South Vermillion Community School Corporation which has three primary elementary schools, one middle school, and one high school.

Elementary schools

 Central Elementary School
 Ernie Pyle Elementary School 
 Van Duyn Elementary School

Glendale Elementary and Matthew's South Elementary schools, which were both located in Clinton City limits, consolidated with Central Elementary in the mid 1980s. The school district's residents could fit into one main elementary school, but because of the rural area around Clinton the decision was made to group the students into three smaller schools.

Middle and high schools

The middle school and high school are both located north of the city, in an unincorporated area of the county. 
 South Vermillion Middle School
 South Vermilion High School

The high school was formerly known as Clinton High School before the current school was constructed in 1977. However, the mascot has remained the same, the Wildcat.

Post-secondary education is served through Indiana State University, Saint Mary-of-the-Woods College, Rose-Hulman Institute of Technology and Ivy Tech Community College of Indiana in nearby Terre Haute.

Public library

The town has a lending library, the Clinton Public Library, which is located at 314 South Fourth Street

Special events
Clinton hosts the annual Little Italy Festival, a four-day Labor Day Weekend celebration of the area's Italian and coal mining heritage. Begun in 1966, the event draws over 75,000 visitors annually, featuring Italian and carnival-style food, grapevine-roofed wine garden, and grape stomping. The festival provides free stage entertainment, flea market and the largest Italian-theme parade in the Midwest. The festival hosts the Indiana Bocce Ball championship, boasts one of the few coal mining museums in the nation, and owns one of fewer than 400 genuine gondolas in the United States. The 2022 Queen of Grapes for the Little Italy Festival is Blythe Heber. The Re and Regina for 2022 are Mr. & Mrs. David and Rae Marietta.

Notable people
 Armando Frigo, second American-born soccer player to ever play in Serie A, Italy's top league.
 Lawrence J. Giacoletto, known for his work in the field of semiconductor circuit technology.
 Margaret Gisolo, baseball pioneer, attended high school in Clinton.
 Charles Edward Jones, astronaut killed in the September 11 attacks.
 Ken Kercheval, actor, best known for his role on the television series Dallas.
 Jill Marie Landis, award-winning romance writer.
 Serial killer Orville Lynn Majors was a licensed practical nurse at the Vermillion County Hospital, now known as Union Hospital, in Spencer, and was convicted in October 1999 of six counts of first-degree murder.  Although convicted of killing six, the exact number is unknown and may be as high as 130. He was sentenced to 360 years in prison.
 Claude Matthews, former Governor of Indiana.
 Sister Esther Newport, painter, art educator and founder of the Catholic Art Association.
 Carrie Parker, the first African-American to graduate from any Vermillion County school and most likely in 1897 the first to attend Indiana University.
 Danny Polo, musician proclaimed by Benny Goodman as "the world's greatest clarinet player."
 Bobby Sturgeon, baseball player of 1940s.
 Henry Dana Washburn, Civil War general, US Congressman, explorer. As surveyor-general of the Montana Territory he led first government survey of Yellowstone Park.
 Clarine Nardi Riddle, the first female attorney general of Connecticut.

Notes

References

Bibliography

External links
 Little Italy Festival Homepage
 Indiana University archive blogs
 Vermillion Rise Mega Park

Cities in Indiana
Italian-American culture in Indiana
Cities in Vermillion County, Indiana
Terre Haute metropolitan area
Populated places established in 1829
1829 establishments in Indiana